Mount Ecclesia (dedicated on October 28, 1911) is the location of the international headquarters of the fraternal and service organization The Rosicrucian Fellowship (TRF), located on grounds in Oceanside, California. It is also the location of its spiritual temple, called The Ecclesia, situated upon the promontory of a high mesa overlooking the San Luis Rey River Valley and the Franciscan Mission San Luis Rey de Francia.

On April 7, 1995, it was added to the National Register of Historic Places as the Rosicrucian Fellowship Temple.

Construction

The vision

Mount Ecclesia was founded after one of the Elder Brothers of the Rose Cross known as "The Teacher" suggested to Max Heindel, Founder of the Rosicrucian Fellowship (8/08/1909), that permanent headquarters be established to support the twin mission of the Organization: to spread the Rosicrucian teachings, (the deeper Esoteric Christian Mysteries); and to heal the sick (according to the spiritual method delineated by the Order of the Rose Cross). On the winter solstice of 1910 The Teacher gave Max Heindel a spiritual vision of the location through "Jupiter Consciousness/picture consciousness/spiritual vision/telepathy" with the mission to find it and start the work.

Finding the location
After months of unfruitful search along the pacific coast between Los Angeles and San Diego California, the Heindels decided, on April 30, 1911, to go visit the famous Franciscan Mission San Luis Rey de Francia, founded in 1798 in Oceanside by Junipero Serra the Franciscan friar from Spain. On their way there, by horse and buggy, they stumbled on the location matching the vision given earlier by The Teacher and discovered that the land was for sale. Mr. Heindel interrupted the trip to the Franciscan mission to return to the real estate office to buy the land. But the sign on the real estate office door said "Office closed to reopen on Wednesday May 3". On May 3, 1911, they returned with their friend Mr. Patterson to Oceanside to buy the land. Shortly after 3.00 pm (at 3.05 pm) Mr. Heindel signed the deed of purchase and secured it with a down payment. They went home to Ocean Park and the same evening Mr. Heindel named the property Mount Ecclesia.

Groundbreaking

It took them six months to get ready to leave their cottage in Ocean Park. They finally came down to fellowship's new headquarters on the 40 acres (about 16.19 hectares) land of Mount Ecclesia to dedicate it to the "Great Work of the Elder Brothers of the Rose Cross". The dedication ceremony was planned for 12.40 PM on October 28, 1911, in Oceanside California.

Mount Ecclesia was launched that day, through a ceremony of ground-breaking which consisted in planting a large Cross with the initials C.R.C. — representing the symbolical name Christian Rose Cross, who is the Head of the Order of the Rose Cross (Rosicrucian Order) — painted in gilt letters on the trefoils of the three upper arms and with a climbing rose. An excerpt of the first hand description of the mentioned event is as following :

Construction of The Ecclesia
The Ecclesia, the Healing Temple, was erected, for the purpose of affording more powerful means for the healing of disease, and dedicated on December 25, 1920. The project for the building of the Temple had started in 1914. Heindel, who died in 1919, didn't live to see the Temple completed in 1920. His wife, Agusta Foss Heindel, remained active in civic engagement, promoting the Fellowship and working to beautify Oceanside until her death in 1949. Spiritual Healing meetings are held in this holy place at a regular time each day by the Probationers who have consecrated their lives to this work. The architect of the building was Lester A. Cramer.

As in all the solar temples, The Ecclesia portal is facing east (the rising sun). In front of the portal stand two palm trees. The portal is constituted by a triangular-shaped pediment upon two round columns. At the centre of the pediment, there is an equilateral triangle, symbol of Trinity, inscribed by "the eye of God."

The columns fuse Greek (Ionic, Doric and Corinthian) and Roman (Tuscan and composite) styles, each one with a capital crowned by a finial globe. There are three steps between the columns leading to the Temple entrance. At the Temple entrance there are two square pilasters, each showing two faces. The round 12-sided building architecture is composed by round arches and narrow round inward windows. Its great dome is composed by a cupola crowned by a golden globe with a finial of lights. The inner portal and the Temple's interior is ornamented with alchemical and astrological symbols. It is a solar temple dedicated to the coming Age of Aquarius.

On June 29, 1920 (from 11:55 A. M. until 12:02 P. M.), the vision of an event of Spiritual nature at ground's site was reported as following:

On July 23, 1920 (at noon), during the laying of the cornerstone in the north-eastern corner of the temple, the purpose of The Ecclesia was stated in accordance to the commands of Christ, namely, "Preach the gospel and heal the sick":

Spiritual and healing services
Nearly since its inception the Fellowship has been providing the service of spiritual healing; the first service took place on June 23, 1914. On December 25, 1938, the Rosicrucian Fellowship opened a Sanitarium building which was used for a number of years to treat patients with non-contagious diseases. Currently, the healing applications are received by the Fellowship's centers worldwide or directly by the healing department at Mount Ecclesia.

Over the years, the group built a number of structures on the property, including an administration building in 1913, a chapel in 1914, a guesthouse and healing center in 1938, and a business office and cottages in the 1960s and 1970s. Max Heindel, the founder of the Rosicrucian Fellowship, had a dream, yet to be concretized, of a beautiful Grecian theatre envisioned to be built in the canyon below the chapel and in which performances would be given of plays with a spiritual message and occult truths such as the great dramas of Shakespeare and other inspired classics; as well as of the Fellowship's own splendid orchestra composed of permanent students, that it would perform in the theatre works of master composers, particularly those of Beethoven and Wagner whom he knew to be high musical Initiates, and also that classes in initiatory music would be taught there.

The Fellowship runs its own printing press, established by Max Heindel in 1912, which is an area of great activity with hundreds of products being produced: printing the ephemerides, the books (with millions spread worldwide), most of the course materials sent to the members, the periodical Echoes from Mount Ecclesia (which became the Rays from The Rosy Cross in July 1915), the pamphlets (in six languages) that are distributed freely to people and many other various things, such as flyers, brochures, postcards, posters, etc., that are necessary for the diffusion of the Rosicrucian Christian teachings, the Gospel of the coming Age of Aquarius. The organization generated so much mail that the federal government built the city's first post office on Seagaze Drive in 1936 to keep up with the demand.

The historic district of Mount Ecclesia, home to the Rosicrucian Fellowship, is noted for its singular architecture and the preservation of nature grounds and gardens, offering a unique meditative walking experience. Accommodation and vegetarian meals are also provided during the winter and summer school activities.

Financial model
The Rosicrucian Fellowship observes the basic condition, set by its founder Max Heindel, that no price, membership dues or fees, should be put on its teachings, and never to ask for money for membership, for information, for education, nor for healing. The Fellowship has always balanced along the edge of the subsistence level with its funding and maintenance being achieved through the voluntary giving of members and friends, legacies, book-sale profits, housing rentals and cafeteria income and with the assistance of volunteer workers. By setting the example and through self-discipline, Mount Ecclesia seeks : «to unite and harmonize each with the others by teaching a religion that is both scientific and artistic, and to gather all churches into one great Christian Brotherhood.»

The Rosicrucians do not seek temporal power. They seek to serve God by helping their suffering fellowmen. A place of training for the work is beautifully attained in Mount Ecclesia, and now THE ECCLESIA, the TEMPLE OF HEALING, is being built by the loving free-will offerings of friends who give not money alone but personal service and prayers. This method of building is a little new and somewhat slow in these days, as it is not permitted to call out to the world for funds or labor. Each offering must come as a result of the inner promptings of the HEART. Christ's stronghold.

Gallery

See also
 Esoteric Christianity
 New Galilee and the New Jerusalem
 The Rosicrucian Cosmo-Conception

References

Further reading
A Probationer. , in Rays from the Rose Cross, May/June 1996, pages 38–43
A Probationer. , in Rays from the Rose Cross, July/August 1996, pages 30–37

External links
Tour of Mount Ecclesia
The Rosicrucian Fellowship
Take a Hike: Gardens provide respite from everyday bustle, on Sandiegotribune.com

Properties of religious function on the National Register of Historic Places in California
National Register of Historic Places in San Diego County, California
Temples in California
Esoteric Christianity
Rosicrucianism
Religious buildings and structures in San Diego County, California
Oceanside, California
Historic districts on the National Register of Historic Places in California